Valea Adîncă (in Romanian; , Valia-Adynke, Волядинка, Voliadynka; , Valia-Adynka) is  a commune in Camenca District, in the northern part of Transnistria, Moldova. The name in Romanian means "deep valley". It is composed of two villages, Constantinovca and Valea Adîncă.

Nobel Prize laureate Henryk Sienkiewicz situated the Devil's Gorge where the witch Horpyna, a well-known fictional character from the novel With Fire and Sword, lived, as being in this vicinity along the Dniester river. It was rendered under the Polish spelling of Waładynka.

Valea Adîncă is also the site of the Church of the Blessed Virgin's Protection, a Russian Orthodox church.

References

Communes of Transnistria
Camenca District